Taking Wing is a 2000 French drama film directed by Steve Suissa. It was entered into the 22nd Moscow International Film Festival where Suissa won the award for Best Director and Clément Sibony won the award for Best Actor.

Cast
 Clément Sibony as Stan
 Isabelle Carré as Julie
 Christine Citti as Stan's mother
 Marc Samuel as Stan's father
 Léopoldine Serre as Lulu
 Steve Suissa as Joseph
 Corinne Dacla as Marthe
 Bernard Fresson as Victor
 Attica Guedj as Sarah
 Denis Bénoliel as Léon
 Isabelle Nanty as Artistic counselor
 Bernard Verley as French teacher
 Francis Huster as Drama teacher

References

External links
 

2000 films
2000 drama films
French drama films
2000s French-language films
2000s French films